Ilyoplax is a genus of Crab.

List of species
 Ilyoplax danielae Davie & Naruse, 2010
 Ilyoplax delsmani de Man, 1926
 Ilyoplax dentata Ward, 1933
 Ilyoplax dentimerosa Shen, 1932
 Ilyoplax deschampsi Rathbun, 1913
 Ilyoplax formosensis Rathbun, 1921
 Ilyoplax gangetica Kemp, 1919
 Ilyoplax integra Tesch, 1918
 Ilyoplax ningpoensis Shen, 1940
 Ilyoplax obliqua Tweedie, 1935
 Ilyoplax pingi Shen, 1932
 Ilyoplax punctata Tweedie, 1935
 Ilyoplax pusilla de Haan, 1835
 Ilyoplax sayajiraoi Trivedi, Soni Trivedi & Vachhrajani, 2015
 Ilyoplax serrata Shen, 1931
 Ilyoplax strigicarpa Davie, 1988
 Ilyoplax tansuiensis Sakai, 1939

References

Ocypodoidea
Crustaceans of Asia
Mangrove fauna
Fauna of Southeast Asia
Arthropods of Indonesia
Arthropods of the Philippines